Gangamandal Raj Institution is a non government secondary school under Comilla Education Board. The school is located at Jafarganj under Debidwar Upazila in Comilla District. It was established in 1922 in British period by the Jamidars of Gangamandal Pargana.

References 
 

Schools in Comilla District